Garden Bay Marine Provincial Park is a provincial park in British Columbia, Canada at the northwest end of the Sechelt Peninsula on the lower Sunshine Coast, near the community of Madeira Park. Established in 1969, it contains approximately 163 ha.

See also
List of British Columbia provincial parks

References
Garden Bay Marine Park
BC Parks infopage

Provincial parks of British Columbia
Sunshine Coast (British Columbia)
1969 establishments in British Columbia
Protected areas established in 1969
Marine parks of Canada